Carol Marie Goodner (May 30, 1904 – November 29, 2001) was an American actress who appeared mostly in British films and television.

Career
Carol Goodner was born in New York City on May 30, 1904. 

A toe dancer when she was only four years old, she continued to earn her living that way until she was nine, when she went to school. She achieved her first New York stage success in 1926 and the following year made her London debut in the stage play; The Butter and Egg Man at the Garrick Theatre. Her New York theater credits include creating the role of Lorraine Sheldon, loosely based on Gertrude Lawrence, in The Man Who Came to Dinner. In England, she appeared in her first film Those Who Love in 1929. In 1931, when in London, she was a friend of actress Kay Walsh and the girlfriend of actor Henry Wilcoxon. In 1937 she played the title role in John Van Druten's play Gertie Maude at St Martin's Theatre. Goodner returned to America at the outbreak of war in 1939. She appeared in theatre in New York, but made no more films, and retired in 1957.

Personal life
Goodner married Thomas Marshall, a real estate man, in New York City on May 14, 1940. She married actor Frederic Hunter in New Orleans on January 30, 1949.

Goodner filed a voluntary petition of bankruptcy in federal court on July 27, 1944. Her filing indicated that she had $340 in assets and $2,793 in liabilities.

Goodner died on November 29, 2001, in Katonah, New York.

Filmography
 Those Who Love (1929) - Anne
 The Ringer (1931) - Cora Ann Milton
 The Flying Squad (1932) - Ann Perryman
 There Goes the Bride (1932) - Cora
 Strange Evidence (1933) - Marie / Barbara Relf
 Leave It to Smith (1933) - Mary Linkley
 The Fire Raisers (1934) - Helen Vaughan
 Red Ensign (1934) - June MacKinnon
 What's in a Name? (1934) - Marta Radovic
 Mimi (1935) - Musette
 Royal Cavalcade (1935) - Tourist in Tower of London
 The Student's Romance (1935) - Veronika Laubenthaler
 Music Hath Charms (1935) - Mrs. Norbray
 La Vie parisienne/Parisian Life (1936) - Simone
 The Dominant Sex (1937) - Gwen Clayton
 The Frog (1937) - Lola Bassano
 A Royal Divorce (1938) - Mme. Tallien

References

Bibliography
 

1904 births
2001 deaths
20th-century American actresses
American film actresses
American stage actresses
American television actresses
American expatriates in England
Actresses from New York City